Cannabis in East Timor is illegal.

A 2012 assessment undertaken on behalf of the UNFPA noted that cannabis was easily available in East Timor, often termed "ganja", with "coklat" appearing to refer to hashish. 

Cannabis was believed to be grown locally, usually bought and smoked in a pre-rolled joint, while hashish (smoked mixed with tobacco in a cigarette or sometimes a bong) was believed to be smuggled from Indonesia.

On September 15, 2022, the president of East Timor, José Ramos-Horta, gave a speech calling for a more progressive drug policy that would distinguish cannabis from narcotics. He cited the benefits of cannabis on crime, health, and the economy in other countries.

References

East Timor
Society of East Timor
Politics of East Timor